Paula Prentiss (née Ragusa; born March 4, 1938) is an American actress. She is best known for her film roles in Where the Boys Are (1960), What's New Pussycat? (1965), Catch-22 (1970), The Parallax View (1974), and The Stepford Wives (1975).

From 1967 to 1968, Prentiss co-starred with her husband Richard Benjamin in the CBS sitcom He & She, for which she received a nomination for Primetime Emmy Award for Outstanding Lead Actress in a Comedy Series.

Early life 
Prentiss was born Paula Ragusa in San Antonio, Texas, the elder daughter of Paulene (née Gardner) and Thomas J. Ragusa, a social sciences professor at San Antonio's University of the Incarnate Word. Her father was of Sicilian descent, and Prentiss was raised Roman Catholic. She had a younger sister, Ann Prentiss, who was also an actress.

She attended Lamar High School in Houston, Texas. In 1958, while studying drama at Northwestern University, she met future husband Richard Benjamin, who impressed her with his sophistication and height (he was taller than she was). While attending Northwestern she was discovered by Metro-Goldwyn-Mayer and was offered a film contract.

Career
Prentiss leapt to fame playing the role of Tuggle in Where the Boys Are (1960). Her co-star was Jim Hutton. The film was a hit and response to Prentiss and Hutton was very favorable, so MGM decided to reteam them in three more comedies, promoting them as a new William Powell and Myrna Loy: The Honeymoon Machine (1961) with Steve McQueen, Bachelor in Paradise (1961) with Bob Hope, and The Horizontal Lieutenant (1962). They were the two tallest male and female contract players at Metro-Goldwyn-Mayer.

Hutton and Prentiss were also meant to be in Follow the Boys (1963), a Where the Boys Are-style comedy, but he dropped out, and so Prentiss' co-star became Russ Tamblyn.

Howard Hawks cast her as the female lead opposite Rock Hudson in Man's Favorite Sport? (1963) at Universal, her first film outside MGM. Hawks would later say: "Paula Prentiss was good, but she couldn't remember what she was doing from one shot to the next. Her shots never matched".

Prentiss appeared on stage in a production of As You Like It in 1963 at the New York Shakespeare Festival in Central Park. 

She had notable roles in The World of Henry Orient (1964) and In Harm's Way (1965) and made a cameo as herself in Looking for Love (1964). She also had a strong supporting role in What's New, Pussycat? (1965) with Peter Sellers. However, on the set of that film she had a nervous breakdown. "One day during shooting," she told People in 1976, "I just climbed up the ropes to the catwalk and started walking the beams. Very loudly and clearly I called down to everyone on the set, 'I'm going to jump.' A French technician grabbed me, and there I was, hanging by one arm." She was hospitalized for nine months.

For one season (1967–1968), Prentiss co-starred with her husband, Richard Benjamin, in the CBS sitcom He & She. For her role, Prentiss was nominated for an Emmy Award for Best Performance by an Actress in a Comedy.

In 1969 she appeared Off-Broadway in the double production, Arf and The Great Airplane Snatch, directed by Benjamin.

Prentiss returned to films with a small role in Catch-22 (1970). She had the female lead in Move (1970) with Elliott Gould and Born to Win (1971) with George Segal. She was one of the leads in Last of the Red Hot Lovers with Alan Arkin. Next, Prentiss was in the made-for-television film, The Couple Takes a Wife (1972).

She was the female lead in Crazy Joe (1974) and had a small but pivotal part in The Parallax View (1974) with Warren Beatty. She was second lead in The Stepford Wives (1975), alongside Katharine Ross.

In 1976, Prentiss and Benjamin appeared on Broadway in The Norman Conquests. After that, they traveled to Australia to make No Room to Run (1977).

Prentiss was in Having Babies II (1977), Friendships, Secrets and Lies (1979), and Top of the Hill (1980). She had a starring role in The Black Marble (1980), but it was not widely seen.

She did Saturday the 14th (1981) with her husband and was in director Billy Wilder's last film, Buddy Buddy (1981), with Jack Lemmon and Walter Matthau. She then made Packin' It In (1983) with her husband and did the made-for-television film, M.A.D.D.: Mothers Against Drunk Drivers (1983).

Prentiss guest starred on TV shows like Murder, She Wrote and Burke's Law.

Except for brief cameo roles, Prentiss had not appeared in a feature film for more than 30 years, until 2016's I Am the Pretty Thing That Lives in the House, a horror film directed by Oz Perkins. It premiered September 10, 2016 at the Toronto International Film Festival.

Personal life
Prentiss has been married to actor-director Richard Benjamin since 1961. They have two children.

Filmography

Film

Television

References

External links

 
 
 
 

1938 births
20th-century American actresses
21st-century American actresses
Actresses from San Antonio
American film actresses
American people of Italian descent
American stage actresses
American television actresses
Catholics from Texas
Living people
Lamar High School (Houston, Texas) alumni
Northwestern University School of Communication alumni